The term "air sports" covers a range of aerial activities, including air racing, aerobatics, aeromodelling, hang gliding, human-powered aircraft, parachuting, paragliding and skydiving.

Recognized and regulated air sports 

Many air sports are regulated internationally by the Switzerland-based Fédération Aéronautique Internationale (FAI) and nationally by aero clubs such as the National Aeronautics Association (NAA) and the Royal Aero Club (RAeC). The FAI has separate commissions for each air sport. For example, the commission for ballooning is the Commission Internationale de l'Aérostation (CIA).

Sports within the categories of air sports and their respective commissions are as follows:

Motorized 
 Aerobatics (CIVA)
 Aeromodelling (CIAM)
 Air racing (GAC)
 Drone racing (CIAM)
 Flyboarding
 Powered hang gliding (CIMA)
 Powered paragliding (CIMA)
 Rally flying (GAC)
 Rotorcraft (CIG)
 Ultralight aviation (CIMA)

Wind/Gliding 
 Ballooning (CIA)
 Cluster ballooning
 Hopper ballooning
 Canopy piloting (ISC)
 Gliding (IGC)
 Hang gliding (CIVL)
 Human-powered flying (CIACA)
 Kiteboarding/kitesurfing
 Kiting
Kite fighting
 Paragliding (CIVL)

Gravity 
 BASE jumping
 Cliff jumping
 Bodyflight
 Bungee jumping
 High diving
 Parachuting/skydiving (ISC)
 Banzai skydiving
 Skysurfing
 Trapeze
 Wingsuit flying (ISC)

Other activities 
Other aerial activities not governed by the FAI rules:
 Rocket Racing League (an attempt to create a new air sport)

Competitions 
 Reno Air Races
 FAI World Grand Prix
 World Air Games

See also 
 Lawn chair Larry
 Airsport, a Czech aircraft manufacturer

Notes

References

External links 

  (FAI)
  (NAA)

 
General aviation
Sports by type